Southern Outpost is an independent electronic Record label that was started in Sydney, Australia, in 1998 but is now based in San Francisco, United States.

The labels main musical focus is the genre of electro music, having released music from such artists as DJ K1 (from Aux 88), DJ Godfather, Scape One, Dcast Dynamics, dynArec among others.

Discography

External links 

Southern Outpost - Official label website.
Southern Outpost: Discogs – A user-built database of music information.
MySpace - Labels MySpace site.

Australian record labels
Record labels based in Sydney